Yong Mei (born 14 February 1970) is a Chinese actress. In 2019, she won the Silver Bear for Best Actress at the 69th Berlin International Film Festival for her performance in the film So Long, My Son directed by Wang Xiaoshuai.

Early life and education 
An ethnic Mongol, Yong Mei was born on 14 February 1970 in Hohhot, the capital of China's Inner Mongolia Autonomous Region. Her original name in Mongolian is Sunjidma, meaning "fairy", which has given rise to her nickname "Sister Fairy". She studied business administration at the University of International Business and Economics in Beijing, where she was active in performing arts.

Career 
After graduation from university, she initially worked in foreign trade, and later in the studio of the influential television hostess Xu Gehui (许戈辉). On the recommendation of Xu, Yong Mei starred in the 1997 television drama The Man Who Herds the Clouds (牧云的男人) and began her acting career. She had her breakout role in the 2004 television drama A Chinese-style Divorce (中国式离婚), which made her wildly popular. She was also praised for her performances in the TV series Cell Phone (手机), Ocean Paradise (海洋天堂), You Are My Lover (你是我爱人), and Cliff (悬崖, 2012).

In 2015, Yong Mei appeared in Hou Hsiao-hsien's film The Assassin (or Assassin Nie Yinniang), in which she plays the mother of the title character, Nie Yinniang. The production lasted from 2012 to 2014; she thoroughly enjoyed the experience and held the film in high regard. She did not accept a major role for the next few years for lack of a suitable script that met her standard for quality.

The next major film she appeared in was So Long, My Son, directed by Wang Xiaoshuai, in which she portrays a mother who has lost her only son. To prepare for the role, she interviewed a real-life mother who had lost her only child. She originally scheduled two hours for the interview, but it was eventually extended to seven hours and gave her deep insight into a mother's sorrow. The film premiered at the 69th Berlin International Film Festival on 14 February 2019, Yong Mei's 49th birthday. For their performance, Yong Mei and Wang Jingchun, who plays her husband in the film, were awarded the Silver Bear for Best Actress and Best Actor, respectively. She was the first actress from mainland China to win the award.

Personal life 
Yong Mei is married to Luan Shu, the former lead singer of the Beijing rock band Black Panther. She became a fan of the band after being introduced to its music by a friend, and starred in the music video for its song "Don't Break My Heart".

Filmography

Film

Television

Awards and nominations

References

External links

Yong Mei on Douban 

1970 births
Living people
21st-century Chinese actresses
Actresses from Inner Mongolia
Chinese people of Mongolian descent
People from Hohhot
Beijing University of International Business and Economics alumni
Silver Bear for Best Actress winners